John Eckert may refer to:

J. Presper Eckert (1919–1995), American electrical engineer and computer pioneer
John Eckert (musician) (born 1939), American jazz trumpeter

See also
John Ecker (disambiguation)